The men's 10,000 metres walk event at the 1996 World Junior Championships in Athletics was held in Sydney, Australia, at International Athletic Centre on 22 August.

Medalists

Results

Final
22 August

Participation
According to an unofficial count, 24 athletes from 15 countries participated in the event.

References

10,000 metres walk
Racewalking at the World Athletics U20 Championships